Covington is an unincorporated community in Virginia township in Pemiscot County, in the U.S. state of Missouri.

History
A post office called Covington was established in 1877, and remained in operation until 1912. The community was named after the original owner of the site.

References

Unincorporated communities in Pemiscot County, Missouri
Unincorporated communities in Missouri